East Redonda Island is a coastal island in British Columbia, Canada, part of the Discovery Islands archipelago. It lies just to the north of Desolation Sound Marine Park, which is located off the north end of the Malaspina Peninsula at the mouth of Toba Inlet within Electoral Area C of the Strathcona Regional District.

History
Both Redonda Islands were sighted in 1792 by the Spanish explorers Galiano and Valdés and given the name Isla Redonda, meaning "round".

Geography
East Redonda Island is separated from the larger West Redonda Island by Waddington Channel. The eastern side of the island is separated from the mainland by the deep Homfray Channel. Deeply incising this island from Waddington Channel is Pendrell Sound, which runs toward the northeast. At the northern end of the island is Pryce Channel.

The island's shape is similar to that of Orcas Island of the San Juan Islands in Washington.

(50° 14' N; 124° 41' W)

Conservation
The eastern half of the island  is home to the "East Redonda Island Ecological Reserve", a preserve established for forestry research and forest growth. It

References

External links
 East Redonda Island 
 

Redonda
South Coast of British Columbia